Des Arc is a village in Iron County, Missouri, United States. The population was 131 at the 2020 census.

History
Des Arc was laid out in 1871. According to folk etymology, Des Arc, meaning "the bend", was so named from a big bend in the railroad at the town site. However, the State Historical Society of Missouri believes the name may be a corruption of aux arcs, the origin of the name Ozarks. A post office called Des Arc has been in operation since 1871.

Geography

Demographics

2010 census
As of the census of 2010, there were 177 people, 68 households, and 46 families residing in the village. The racial makeup of the village was 94.92% White, 1.69% Black or African American, 0.56% Native American, and 2.82% from two or more races.

There were 68 households, of which 38.2% had children under the age of 18 living with them, 51.5% were married couples living together, 11.8% had a female householder with no husband present, 4.4% had a male householder with no wife present, and 32.4% were non-families. 30.9% of all households were made up of individuals, and 10.3% had someone living alone who was 65 years of age or older. The average household size was 2.60 and the average family size was 3.20.

The median age in the village was 40.1 years. 28.2% of residents were under the age of 18; 7.3% were between the ages of 18 and 24; 19.7% were from 25 to 44; 31% were from 45 to 64; and 13.6% were 65 years of age or older. The gender makeup of the village was 48.0% male and 52.0% female.

2000 census
As of the census of 2000, there were 187 people, 74 households, and 52 families residing in the village. The population density was 889.6 people per square mile (343.8/km2). There were 85 housing units at an average density of 404.4 per square mile (156.3/km2). The racial makeup of the village was 98.93% White, 0.53% Native American, and 0.53% from two or more races.

There were 74 households, out of which 33.8% had children under the age of 18 living with them, 56.8% were married couples living together, 9.5% had a female householder with no husband present, and 28.4% were non-families. 23.0% of all households were made up of individuals, and 10.8% had someone living alone who was 65 years of age or older. The average household size was 2.53 and the average family size was 3.00.

In the village, the population was spread out, with 27.8% under the age of 18, 2.7% from 18 to 24, 28.3% from 25 to 44, 21.4% from 45 to 64, and 19.8% who were 65 years of age or older. The median age was 39 years. For every 100 females, there were 96.8 males. For every 100 females age 18 and over, there were 98.5 males.

The median income for a household in the village was $22,917, and the median income for a family was $23,750. Males had a median income of $37,083 versus $15,000 for females. The per capita income for the village was $10,461. About 26.6% of families and 29.1% of the population were below the poverty line, including 33.9% of those under the age of 18 and 20.0% of those 65 or over.

References

Villages in Iron County, Missouri
Villages in Missouri